The Contemporary African Art Collection (CAAC) is a private collection created in 1989 by Jean Pigozzi, an Italian businessman. As of May 2022, the collection was based in Geneva, Switzerland, but it "does not have a permanent exhibition venue".

after his encounter with French independent curator, André Magnin.  Magnin specializes in art from non-Western cultures, and especially sub-Saharan art.  The CAAC came into being at a time when non-Western contemporary art was largely ignored on the international scene.  It was founded shortly after the seminal exhibition The Magicians of the Earth at the Pompidou Center in Paris, curated by Jean-Huber Martin.   It was the first truly international exhibition where contemporary works from all over the world were shown on an equal footing.

The CAAC includes several thousand artworks, featuring sculptures, drawings, photographs, installations and videos,  by over 80 artists, living and working in sub-Saharan African countries.  Some of its artists live in large cities and attended art schools.  Others were "self-taught" and some are from remote areas and work within local traditions that they extend and enrich.

The CAAC regularly organizes exhibitions and artwork loans  in major museums and art foundations around the world, such as Tate Modern (London), Pompidou Center (Paris), Guggenheim Bilbao, Metropolitan Museum (NY), Museum of Fine Arts, Houston (Texas),  National Museum of African Art (Washington), Cartier Foundation (Paris) and the Saatchi Gallery (London).  It also has published several catalogues and monographies.

Artists in the collection

References

External links
  The Contemporary African Art Collection

African art
African art museums
Voodoo art
1990 establishments in Italy
Private collections in Italy